Hits From 10 Albums is the second compilation album by the Canadian rock band Trooper, after Hot Shots, released in 1979. The album consists of the band's most popular songs, digitally remastered by Craig Waddell. The album was released on July 1, 2010, to celebrate the band's 35th anniversary, as their first album Trooper was released on July 1, 1975.

Track listing
 3:10 - "Baby Woncha Please Come Home"
 3:08 - "General Hand Grenade"
 3:00 - "The Boys in the Bright White Sports Car" [Hot Shots version]
 3:30 - "Two for the Show"
 2:56 - "Santa Maria"
 3:32 - "We're Here for a Good Time (Not a Long Time)"
 4:36 - "Oh, Pretty Lady"
 3:43 - "Raise a Little Hell"
 3:21 - "The Moment That It Takes"
 4:17 - "Round, Round We Go"
 4:40 - "3 Dressed Up as a 9"
 4:10 - "Janine"
 3:38 - "Real Canadians"
 4:26 - "It Comes and It Goes"
 4:03 - "Thin White Line"
 3:35 - "Boy with a Beat"
 3:43 - "The American Dream"

References

External links
 
 Official Trooper Site

Trooper (band) albums
2010 compilation albums
Universal Music Canada albums